Jean Delespine or Jean de l'Espine (1505–1576), was a French angevin architect of the Renaissance.

Biography 
Jean Delespine was a renowned architect. The Renaissance in Anjou owes much to the artistic and architectural production of this master builder. Today he is attributed about forty works, almost all located in the former province of Anjou.

Jean Delespine was, at his beginnings, the student of Jean Mariau, an architect in Angers, to whom he succeeded, in 1535, as Commissaire des œuvres et réparations de la ville of Angers.

Delespine was in charge of important urban developments.

In 1571, Delespine ceased his duties as curator of the city's works.

In 1576, he died in his home of the rue Beaurepaire in Angers. His body lies in the church next to the Carmelite convent. His tomb bore an epitaph to the glory of his architectural talents: ... mais qui n’admireroit ta hardie entreprise / de ta brave lanterne au pignon de l’église / posée en l’air si hault entre deux piramides / dont les poincts eslevez touchent aux nues liquides / ....

 also reports some extracts of this epitaph: On cognoist l'arbre au fruit, l'ouvrier à l'ouvrage / les tiens portent assez, L'Espine, tesmoignage / De l'excellent esprit dont Dieu t'avoit pourveu / quand parmi les plus grands en crédit on téa veu.

Works 
 Saint-Maurice d’Angers Cathedral. In 1533, the bell tower of the middle tower caught fire. Master Jehan of L'Espine was in charge of the reconstruction of the bell tower. He built the gallery housing the statues of Saint Maurice and his knights companions between the bases of the towers on the western façade. The statues were sculpted by Jean Giffard and Antoine Desmarais.
 Château d'Ancenis
 Château of La Flèche
 Château de Serrant
 Château de Valençay.
 The original castle became a Jesuit college, and currently the military school of the Prytanée national militaire of La Flèche;
 The  at Angers.
 The palace of Angers, seat of the présidial of Angers
 The development of a new river port in Angers under the municipality of mayor René Ayrault who will leave his name to this realization: the port Ayrault
 Modernisation of the Angevin fortifications and creation of two monumental city gates
 Construction of the Renaissance bell tower of Les Rosiers-sur-Loire
 Building of the bridge of Durtal
 Realization of tombs, churches, manors, mansions, fountains, etc.

Gallery 
Some of the works by Jean Delespine

References

External links 
 1557 - Jean Delespine, architecte Archives ville d'Angers
 Jean de l'Espine on Structurae
 Jean Delespine on Wiki Anjou

Renaissance architects
16th-century French architects
1505 births
1576 deaths